Short Line is a brand name for three different Coach USA companies, Hudson Transit Lines, Hudson Transit Corporation,  and Chenango Valley Bus Lines that provide local, commuter  and intercity bus service in  lower New York State, primarily along the Route 17 and Southern Tier corridor. Coach USA acquired the companies in 1998.

Service types
Short Line's service can be defined in several categories:

Local bus service
Short Line, under contract to Orange County, provides local bus service along the former Erie Main Line corridor along Route 17M. ShortLine also owns local routes traveling along Routes 17K and 32 in Orange County, as well as local routes traveling onward from Middletown onward to Route 209, and to other towns along Route 17.

Commuter bus service
Within the New York metropolitan area, ShortLine operates commuter services along the Route 17 corridor, Interstate 84, Routes 208 and 32, and Rockland and Bergen (NJ Route 17) counties to New York City.

In addition, under contract to the New York State Department of Transportation and Rockland County Department of Public Transportation, ShortLine provides commuter bus service from Orange and Rockland Counties to White Plains and Tarrytown.

Intercity bus service
Within and beyond the New York metropolitan area, ShortLine provides scheduled service to and from Long Island to the Southern Tier (via Middletown and Monticello) and service to and from major colleges and universities in the region, such as Cornell University, SUNY Alfred, Binghamton University, Ithaca College, and SUNY Albany, and intermediate points. The central hub for all of these routes is Binghamton, via Routes X178 and 495.

Route detail
Short Line provides service along 29 routes. Details are listed below for the full route only. Some schedules may serve only portions of the line, skip some stops, or may service multiple routes.

Unless noted, all service is provided using Coach USA-branded vehicles.

Bergen, Rockland, and Westchester County routes

Orange, Dutchess, Ulster and Pike County routes
These routes service the outer regions of the New York metropolitan area.

Beyond the New York metro area
These routes run primarily from the New York Metro area to points in the Southern Tier (Sullivan County and beyond), or service the Southern Tier of New York State exclusively.

Incidents
On June 12, 2017, in New York City, a Hudson Transit Lines bus was involved in a crash in which driver Dave Lewis ran over and killed bicyclist Dan Hanegby, an Israeli-American athlete and cycling enthusiast. The bus driver was arrested due to this incident, on a misdemeanor charge.

See also
Greyhound Lines
Trailways of New York

References

External links
ShortLine home page
Short Line Bus Company on CPTDB Wiki

Intercity bus companies of the United States
Surface transportation in Greater New York
Stagecoach Group bus operators in the United States and Canada
Transport companies established in 1922
Bus transportation in New York (state)
Bus transportation in New Jersey
1922 establishments in New York (state)
Transportation companies based in New York (state)
Transportation companies based in New Jersey